Lightning Ridge is a 1940 book by Ion Idriess. It was an autobiographical account of part of his life, in particular his time in opal mining in Lightning Ridge.

References

1940 non-fiction books
Books by Ion Idriess
Australian autobiographies
Angus & Robertson books